Utetheisa aegrotum is a moth in the family Erebidae. It was described by Charles Swinhoe in 1892. It is found in Australia, where it has been recorded from Queensland and New South Wales.

References

Moths described in 1892
aegrotum